Glycogen synthase (UDP-glucose-glycogen glucosyltransferase) is a key enzyme in glycogenesis, the conversion of glucose into glycogen. It is a glycosyltransferase that catalyses the reaction of UDP-glucose and (1,4-α-D-glucosyl)n to yield UDP and (1,4-α-D-glucosyl)n+1.

Structure 

Much research has been done on glycogen degradation through studying the structure and function of glycogen phosphorylase, the key regulatory enzyme of glycogen degradation. On the other hand, much less is known about the structure of glycogen synthase, the key regulatory enzyme of glycogen synthesis. The crystal structure of glycogen synthase from Agrobacterium tumefaciens, however, has been determined at 2.3 A resolution. In its asymmetric form, glycogen synthase is found as a dimer, whose monomers are composed of two Rossmann-fold domains. This structural property, among others, is shared with related enzymes, such as glycogen phosphorylase and other glycosyltransferases of the GT-B superfamily. Nonetheless, a more recent characterization of the Saccharomyces cerevisiae (yeast) glycogen synthase crystal structure reveals that the dimers may actually interact to form a tetramer. Specifically, The inter-subunit interactions are mediated by the α15/16 helix pairs, forming allosteric sites between subunits in one combination of dimers and active sites between subunits in the other combination of dimers. Since the structure of eukaryotic glycogen synthase is highly conserved among species, glycogen synthase likely forms a tetramer in humans as well.

Glycogen synthase can be classified in two general protein families. The first family (GT3), which is from mammals and yeast, is approximately 80 kDa, uses UDP-glucose as a sugar donor, and is regulated by phosphorylation and ligand binding. The second family (GT5), which is from bacteria and plants, is approximately 50 kDA, uses ADP-glucose as a sugar donor, and is unregulated.

Mechanism 

Although the catalytic mechanisms used by glycogen synthase are not well known, structural similarities to glycogen phosphorylase at the catalytic and substrate binding site suggest that the mechanism for synthesis is similar in glycogen synthase and glycogen phosphorylase.

Function 
Glycogen synthase catalyzes the conversion of the glucosyl (Glc) moiety of uridine diphosphate glucose (UDP-Glc) into glucose to be incorporated into glycogen via an α(1→4) glycosidic bond. However, since glycogen synthase requires an oligosaccharide primer as a glucose acceptor, it relies on glycogenin to initiate de novo glycogen synthesis.

In a recent study of transgenic mice, an overexpression of glycogen synthase and an overexpression of phosphatase both resulted in excess glycogen storage levels. This suggests that glycogen synthase plays an important biological role in regulating glycogen/glucose levels and is activated by dephosphorylation.

Isozymes 

In humans, there are two paralogous isozymes of glycogen synthase:

The liver enzyme expression is restricted to the liver, whereas the muscle enzyme is widely expressed. Liver glycogen serves as a storage pool to maintain the blood glucose level during fasting, whereas muscle glycogen synthesis accounts for disposal of up to 90% of ingested glucose. The role of muscle glycogen is as a reserve to provide energy during bursts of activity.

Meanwhile, the muscle isozyme plays a major role in the cellular response to long-term adaptation to hypoxia. Notably, hypoxia only induces expression of the muscle isozyme and not the liver isozyme. However, muscle-specific glycogen synthase activation may lead to excessive accumulation of glycogen, leading to damage in the heart and central nervous system following ischemic insults.

Regulation 

The reaction is highly regulated by allosteric effectors such as glucose 6-phosphate (activator)  and by phosphorylation reactions (deactivating). Glucose-6-phosphate allosteric activating action allows glycogen synthase to operate as a glucose-6-phosphate sensor. The inactivating phosphorylation is triggered by the hormone glucagon, which is secreted by the pancreas in response to decreased blood glucose levels. The enzyme also cleaves the ester bond between the C1 position of glucose and the pyrophosphate of UDP itself.

The control of glycogen synthase is a key step in regulating glycogen metabolism and glucose storage. Glycogen synthase is directly regulated by glycogen synthase kinase 3 (GSK-3), AMPK, protein kinase A (PKA), and casein kinase 2 (CK2). Each of these protein kinases lead to phosphorylated and catalytically inactive glycogen synthase.  The phosphorylation sites of glycogen synthase are summarized below.  

For enzymes in the GT3 family, these regulatory kinases inactivate glycogen synthase by phosphorylating it at the N-terminal of the 25th residue and the C-terminal of the 120th residue. Glycogen synthase is also regulated by protein phosphatase 1 (PP1), which activates glycogen synthase via dephosphorylation.  PP1 is targeted to the glycogen pellet by four targeting subunits, GM, GL, PTG and R6. These regulatory enzymes are regulated by insulin and glucagon signaling pathways.

Clinical significance 
Mutations in the GYS1 gene are associated with glycogen storage disease type 0. In humans, defects in the tight control of glucose uptake and utilization are also associated with diabetes and hyperglycemia. Patients with type 2 diabetes normally exhibit low glycogen storage levels because of impairments in insulin-stimulated glycogen synthesis and suppression of glycogenolysis. Insulin stimulates glycogen synthase by inhibiting glycogen synthase kinases or/and activating protein phosphatase 1 (PP1) among other mechanisms.

Model organisms

Model organisms have been used in the study of GYS2 function. A conditional knockout mouse line, called Gys2tm1a(KOMP)Wtsi was generated as part of the International Knockout Mouse Consortium program — a high-throughput mutagenesis project to generate and distribute animal models of disease to interested scientists — at the Wellcome Trust Sanger Institute. Male and female animals underwent a standardized phenotypic screen to determine the effects of deletion. Twenty six tests were carried out and two significant phenotypes were reported. Homozygous mutant male adults displayed impaired glucose tolerance, whereas females had a significant decrease in circulating glucose levels as determined by clinical chemistry.

References

External links

Carbohydrates
Transferases
EC 2.4.1
Genes mutated in mice